Anesrif is a transport business created by the government of Algeria, to expand and modernise the Algerian railway system.

Name
Anesrif's full name, in French, is Agence nationale d’études et de suivi de la réalisation des investissements ferroviaires. This translates as National Agency for the Planning and Implementation of Railway Investments.

Purpose
Anesrif was founded by the government of Algeria on 20 July 2005, in order to plan and invest in the expansion and modernisation of the country's railways, under the supervision of the Minister of Transport. 900 billion dinars of funding was allocated. SNTF handles the day-to-day operation of the railways. Other businesses, including Alstom and Astaldi, bid for contracts to actually build new lines or install equipment.

Anesrif is headquartered in Algiers, and it is structured as an Établissement Public à caractère Industriel et Commercial, or "EPIC"; SNTF is an EPIC too. It is an affiliate of the UIC.

Development of Algerian railways, as with aviation, road, and water transport, has been overshadowed by big high-profile projects which are an inefficient use of resources; private sector investment is minimal and productivity of assets and employees is low. This causes problems for the rest of the economy.

Algeria had a 2009-14 economic development plan which allocated €110 billion for infrastructure improvements. However, there are concerns about the government's ability to manage the new capacity, and to put it to good use. Rail development has been based on very old plans - even dating back to the 1970s - assuming demands from heavy industries which never materialised.

Projects
 Anesrif is developing the High Plateau line, a new railway line spanning Algeria from east to west, supplementing the existing coastal railway;
 A railway from Tlemcen to the Moroccan border at Akid Abbas. The border with Morocco has been closed since 1994, but there is pressure to reopen the border to travellers.
 A southern loop line, connecting Hassi Messaoud - Ouargla - Ghardaia - Laghouat - Djelfa.
 Modernisation and doubling of several existing lines, including Birtouta - Zéralda.

New lines are at the planning stage
 Béchar - Mécheria - Redjem;
 High-speed line from Bordj bou Arréridj - Khemis Miliana;
 Boumedfaâ - Djelfa, connecting to the southern loop line
 Hassi Messaoud - Touggourt.

See also
 Transport in Algeria

References

External links
 Anesrif: English-language homepage
 SNTF
 ERTMS in Algeria

2005 establishments in Algeria
Government-owned companies of Algeria
Railway companies of Algeria
Railway companies established in 2005
Algerian brands
Companies based in Algiers